Grady Avenell (born December 25, 1972) is an American musician. He is the singer for hardcore-metal band Will Haven.

Avenell was born in California. He is notable for his intense vocal style, consisting mainly of screaming. He formed Will Haven in 1995 with members of the band Sock, releasing three albums (El Diablo, WHVN and the acclaimed Carpe Diem) before leaving the band in 2002, wishing to look after his family and attend college. He returned to the group in 2005, although missed some shows in Glasgow and Newport in January 2006, with his position filled by various artists such as Simon Neil of Biffy Clyro, Craig B of Aereogramme and Mikey Demus of Skindred. He again departed in 2007 before recording for The Heirophant took place, returning again in 2009 to record on 2011s Voir Dire. He has appeared on all Will Haven releases except for 2007's The Heirophant, although he did contribute to the songwriting process.

Discography
With Will Haven
1997 – El Diablo
1999 – WHVN
2001 – Carpe Diem
2011 – Voir Dire
2018 – Muerte

As a guest musician
Far (band) – 9 Miles and Do They Know It's Christmas? (with Chino Moreno)
Soulfly – Pain (with Chino Moreno) on the album Primitive

References 

1972 births
Living people
American male singers
Will Haven members
21st-century American singers